Psephellus is a genus of flowering plants in the family Asteraceae, native to eastern Europe and western Asia. A taxonomic revision reassigned many species from Centaurea to Psephellus.

Species
Currently accepted species include:

Psephellus abchasicus Albov
Psephellus absinthifolius Galushko
Psephellus adjaricus (Albov) Mikheev
Psephellus albovii (Sosn.) Mikheev
Psephellus alexeenkoi Alieva
Psephellus amblyolepis (Ledeb.) Wagenitz
Psephellus andinus Galushko & Alieva
Psephellus annae Galushko
Psephellus appendiciger (K.Koch) Wagenitz
Psephellus araxinus (Gabrieljan) Greuter
Psephellus arpensis (Czerep.) Wagenitz
Psephellus atropatanus (Grossh.) Greuter
Psephellus aucherianus (DC.) Boiss.
Psephellus avaricus (Tzvelev) Wagenitz
Psephellus bagadensis (Woronow) Greuter
Psephellus barbeyi Albov
Psephellus bellus (Trautv.) Wagenitz
Psephellus boissieri Sosn.
Psephellus bornmuelleri (Hausskn. ex Bornm.) Wagenitz
Psephellus brevifimbriatus (Hub.-Mor.) Wagenitz
Psephellus buschiorum Sosn.
Psephellus carbonatus (Klokov) Greuter
Psephellus carthalinicus Sosn.
Psephellus caucasicus (Sosn.) Greuter
Psephellus circassicus (Albov) Galushko
Psephellus ciscaucasicus (Sosn.) Galushko
Psephellus colchicus Sosn.
Psephellus congestus (Wagenitz) Wagenitz
Psephellus cronquistii (Takht. & Gabrieljan) Gabrieljan
Psephellus czerepanovii Alieva
Psephellus czirkejensis (Husseinov) Greuter
Psephellus daghestanicus Sosn.
Psephellus dealbatus K.Koch
Psephellus debedicus (Gabrieljan) Gabrieljan
Psephellus declinatus K.Koch
Psephellus dimitriewae (Sosn.) Greuter
Psephellus dittrichii (Gabrieljan) Gabrieljan
Psephellus erivanensis Lipsky
Psephellus erzincani Wagenitz & Kandemir
Psephellus eugenii (Sosn.) Wagenitz
Psephellus fajvuschii (Gabrieljan) Greuter
Psephellus freynii Sint. ex Bornm.
Psephellus galactochroa (Rech.f.) Parsa
Psephellus galushkoi Alieva
Psephellus gamidii Alieva
Psephellus geghamensis (Gabrieljan) Gabrieljan
Psephellus gilanicus (Bornm.) Wagenitz
Psephellus goeksunensis (Aytaç & H.Duman) Greuter & Raab-Straube
Psephellus gracillimus (Wagenitz) Wagenitz
Psephellus hadimensis (Wagenitz, Ertugrul & Dural) Wagenitz
Psephellus holophyllus (Soczava & Lipatova) Greuter
Psephellus holtzii (Wagenitz) Wagenitz
Psephellus huber-morathii (Wagenitz) Wagenitz
Psephellus hymenolepis 
Psephellus hypoleucus Boiss.
Psephellus iljinii (Czerniak.) Wagenitz
Psephellus incanescens Boiss.
Psephellus integrifolius K.Koch
Psephellus karabaghensis Sosn.
Psephellus karduchorum (Boiss.) Wagenitz
Psephellus kemulariae Kharadze
Psephellus khalkhalensis Ranjbar & Negaresh
Psephellus kobstanicus (Tzvelev) Wagenitz
Psephellus kolakovskyi (Sosn.) Greuter
Psephellus kopet-daghensis (Iljin) Wagenitz
Psephellus leucophyllus C.A.Mey.
Psephellus leuzeoides (Jaub. & Spach) Wagenitz
Psephellus maleevii Sosn.
Psephellus manakyanii (Gabrieljan) Gabrieljan
Psephellus marschallianus (Spreng.) K.Koch
Psephellus meskheticus (Sosn.) Gabrieljan
Psephellus mucroniferus (DC.) Wagenitz
Psephellus oltensis Wagenitz
Psephellus pambakensis Sosn.
Psephellus paucilobus Boiss.
Psephellus pecho (Albov) Wagenitz
Psephellus pergamaceus (DC.) Wagenitz
Psephellus phaeopappoides (Bordz.) Wagenitz
Psephellus poluninii (Wagenitz) Wagenitz
Psephellus popovae (Gabrieljan) Gabrieljan
Psephellus prokhanovii Galushko
Psephellus psephelloides (Freyn & Sint.) Wagenitz
Psephellus pseudoandinus Galushko & Alieva
Psephellus pulcherrimus (Willd.) Wagenitz
Psephellus pyrroblepharus (Boiss.) Wagenitz
Psephellus recepii Wagenitz & Kandemir
Psephellus ruprechtii (Boiss.) Greuter
Psephellus salviifolius Boiss.
Psephellus schischkinii (Tzvelev) Wagenitz
Psephellus schistosus (Sosn.) Alieva
Psephellus sergii (Klokov) A.L.Ebel
Psephellus sibiricus (L.) Wagenitz
Psephellus simplicicaulis (Boiss. & A.Huet) Wagenitz
Psephellus somcheticus Sosn.
Psephellus straminicephalus (Hub.-Mor.) Wagenitz
Psephellus sumensis (Kalen.) Greuter
Psephellus taochius Sosn.
Psephellus transcaucasicus Sosn.
Psephellus trinervius (Willd.) Wagenitz
Psephellus troitzkii Sosn.
Psephellus turcicus A.Duran & Hamzaoglu
Psephellus turgaicus (Klokov) A.L.Ebel
Psephellus vanensis A.Duran, Behçet & B.Dogan
Psephellus vvedenskii Sosn.
Psephellus woronowii Sosn.
Psephellus xanthocephalus Fisch. & C.A.Mey. ex Boiss.
Psephellus xeranthemoides (Rech.f.) Wagenitz
Psephellus yildizii (Civelek, Türkoglu & Akan) Greuter
Psephellus yusufeliensis Tugay & Uysal
Psephellus zangezuri Sosn.
Psephellus zuvandicus Sosn.

References

Cynareae
Asteraceae genera